enod40, also known as early nodulin 40, is a gene found in flowering plants. The gene has characteristics of both protein and Non-coding RNA genes. There is
some evidence that the non-coding characteristics of this gene are more widely conserved than the
protein coding sequences.
In soyabeans enod40 was found to be expressed during
early stages of formation of nitrogen-fixing root nodules that are associated with symbiotic soil rhizobial bacteria.
The gene is also active in roots containing fungi forming phosphate-acquiring arbuscular mycorrhiza.

An interaction with a novel RNA-binding protein MtRBP1 (Medicago truncatula RNA-binding protein 1) investigated in the development of Root nodule suggests ENOD40 has a function of cytoplasmic relocalization of nuclear proteins.
In the study of non-legume plants, the over-expression of ENOD40 in transgenic Arabidopsis lines was observed a reduction of cell expansion.

See also
 Non-coding RNA#Bifunctional RNA

References

Further reading

External links
 ENTREZ page for Lotus japonicus ENOD40
 
 NONCODE entry for ENOD40 RNA

Non-coding RNA